Nicola Finetti is an Australian fashion designer known for his eponymous fashion label, launched in 1995. Born in Bari, Italy, he studied architecture in Rome before emigrating to Australia in 1984 and now resides in Sydney. His designs have been seen on Cate Blanchett, Miranda Kerr, Jennifer Hawkins and Lyndsey Rodrigues. He has described his designs as a combination of femininity and strength.

References

Living people
Italian fashion designers
Australian fashion designers
Year of birth missing (living people)